Zhao Faqing (born 3 January 1964) is a former Chinese footballer.

Club career
Born in Dalian, Liaoning, Zhao joined provincial team Liaoning. During his time with Liaoning, Zhao won one Chinese National League title in 1985 and five Jia-A League titles. In 1996, Zhao joined Qianwei Huandao. Zhao played for the club for three seasons before retiring in 1998 to focus on coaching. In 2000, Zhao briefly came out of retirement to play for the club due to an injury crisis, and renamed Chongqing Lifan following his takeover.

International career
On 3 August 1990, Zhao made his debut for China in a 1–1 draw against South Korea.

International goals
Scores and results list China's goal tally first.

Managerial career
Zhao began coaching when he was a player at Qianwei Huandao. In 2001, Zhao moved to Shenyang Ginde and became a manager in 2002. In 2007, Zhao became an assistant coach at former club Liaoning, before becoming a player for Hunan Billows in 2009. On June 21 2011, Zhao was announced the manager of Chongqing. During the 2013 China League Two season, Zhao managed Shenyang Dongjin following the club's relegation from the China League One. In 2014, Zhao was appointed a manager of Nanjing Qianbao, and remained in the club for a season after their relocation to Chengdu. 

In February 2019, following a stint as coaching at Inner Mongolia Zhongyou, Zhao was named as one of the coaching staff at Dalian Chanjoy.

References

1964 births
Footballers from Dalian
Association football defenders
Chinese footballers
China international footballers
Chinese football managers
Liaoning F.C. players
Chongqing Liangjiang Athletic F.C. players
Guangzhou City F.C. managers
Living people
Association football coaches
Footballers at the 1990 Asian Games
Asian Games competitors for China
Hunan Billows F.C. managers